Iglesia de San Andrés (Bedriñana) is a church in the parish of Bedriñana, Asturias, Spain. It dates to the 9th century and was declared a national monument in 1931.

Architecture
The nave was built in the tenth century.  Four of the original windows above the nave survive.  Significant additional expansion occurred in the 12th-13th centuries and again in the 16th.  In 1916, additional improvements were made to the building for use as a school.

See also
Catholic Church in Spain

References

Further reading

, discusses the 2004-2006 restoration effort

Churches in Asturias
1023 establishments in Europe
11th-century establishments in the Kingdom of León
Bien de Interés Cultural landmarks in Asturias